Savage Brigade (French: La Brigade sauvage) is a 1939 French drama film directed by Marcel L'Herbier and starring Véra Korène, Charles Vanel and Florence Marly. The film was completed by Jean Dréville. The film's sets were designed by the art director Serge Piménoff.

Synopsis 
A Russian general's wife is killed by a jealous mistress at the apartment of a lieutenant. The general provokes a duel with  the junior officer, but with the approach of the 1914 war the duel is deferred as both officers are needed with their regiments. Twenty years later in Paris, the general comes across and shoots the former lieutenant whom he injures; the truth about his wife then emerges.

Cast 
 Véra Korène as Marie Kalitjeff
 Charles Vanel as Général Kalitjeff
 Youcca Troubetzkov as Boris Mirski 
 Lisette Lanvin as Natasha Kalitjeff
 Florence Marly as Isa Ostrowski
 Roger Duchesne as Grand-duc Paul
 Jean Galland as Maximoff
 Paul Amiot
 Denis d'Inès
 Paul Demange
 Ève Francis
 Georgina
 Georgette Lefebvre
 Liliane Lesaffre
 Henri Monteux
 Pierre Nay
 André Nox
 Poussard
 Philippe Richard 
 Georges Vitray
 Josette Zell

Notes and references

External links 
 The page on Cinéma Français accessed 27 November 2013

1939 films
1930s French-language films
Films directed by Marcel L'Herbier
Films scored by Michel Michelet
1939 drama films
French drama films
Films set in Paris
Films set in Russia
Films set in the 1910s
French black-and-white films
1930s French films